Sasawini (sasawi (hispaniziced spelling sasahui) local name for Leucheria daucifolia, -ni an Aymara suffix to indicate ownership, "the one with the sasawi", hispanicized spellings Sasahuine, Sasahuini) is a mountain in the Andes of southern Peru, about  high. It is located in the Tacna Region, Candarave Province, Candarave District. It lies southeast of a lake named Such'i (Suches). Jichu Qullu is south of it.

References

Mountains of Tacna Region
Mountains of Peru